Quicklaunch is a currently inactive company attempting to use a type of space gun to launch payloads into low Earth orbit. It is a university spin-off of the SHARP project which ended 2005.

Quicklauncher

The Quicklaunch proposed firing apparatus was a light-gas gun using hydrogen as the working gas and natural gas as the explosive heat source. Heating and pre-pressurizing the hydrogen working gas takes 10 minutes before the shot and most of the hydrogen is recovered by a muzzle muffler at the end of the launch tube to be reused for subsequent launches.

The  gun would be, for the most part, submerged in the ocean. Its horizontal and vertical direction (azimuth and elevation) could be adjusted based on customer launch requirements.

The proposed launcher was designed to give projectiles an initial speed of  while the Earth orbital speed is 6.9 to 7.8 km/s. The projectile design therefore included a one-stage rocket which ignites some time after launch. The designed payloads could include spacecraft, satellites, consumable, water or fuel to supply a propellant depot in orbit.

Project phases
 A two-year 10 million dollar project to launch to orbit a  payload each time. 
 A two-year 50 million dollar project to launch to orbit a  payload each time. 
 A three-year 500 million dollar project to build and operate multiple 1,100 meter long Quicklaunchers called the QL-1000 that are capable of launching  propellant payloads to orbit. The goal is to supply  of fuel to orbital propellant depots yearly.

Hiatus
In a 2016 article, Hunter remarked that the work had been put in stasis due in part to Elon Musk's company, SpaceX, taking up the challenge of reducing costs to orbit. Hunter however invited someone with a similar level of money and motivation, to take a fresh look at the approach. Later, Hunter ran a new start-up called Green Launch that is also developing a space light-gas gun.

See also 

 Non-rocket spacelaunch
 Super High Altitude Research Project

References

External links 
Shooting right for the stars with one gargantuan gas gun - Excerpt from 1996 Smithsonian Magazine on Hunter's work with SHARP. The final paragraph contains the financial assessment.
SHARP Gun Accelerates Scramjets to Mach 9", by William B Scott, Aviation Week and Space Technology, September 9, 1996, page 63.
Encyclopedia Astronautica - SHARP
Video Interview of John Hunter - Gas Station In Space  moonandback 2011
Audio Interview of John Hunter on The space show
 detailed PDF of a land based version

Space guns
Aerospace companies of the United States
Private spaceflight companies
Space access